Gabi Schottroff (born 8 February 1997) is a Swiss volleyball player. She is a member of the Women's National Team.
She participated at the 2017 Montreux Volley Masters, and 2018 Montreux Volley Masters.
She plays for Voléro Zürich.

References

External links 

 

1996 births
Living people
Swiss women's volleyball players